Anton Ryakhov (born May 29, 1980) is an Uzbek-born Russian sprint canoer who has competed since the early 2000s. He won nine medals at the ICF Canoe Sprint World Championships with three silvers (K-1 200 m: 2002, K-1 500 m: 2001, 2006) and six bronzes (K-1 200 m: 2001, 2003, 2005; K-1 500 m: 2002, K-2 1000 m: 2010, K-4 1000 m: 2011).

Ryakhov also competed in four Summer Olympics, earning his best finish of fifth in the K-1 500 m event at Beijing in 2008. Until the 2004 Summer Olympics, Ryakhov competed for Uzbekistan. Since those games, he has competed for Russia.

In June 2015, he competed in the inaugural European Games, for Russia in canoe sprint, more specifically, Men's K-4 1000m with Alexandr Sergeev, Vasily Pogreban, and Vladislav Blintcov. He earned a silver medal.

References

1980 births
Canoeists at the 2000 Summer Olympics
Canoeists at the 2004 Summer Olympics
Canoeists at the 2008 Summer Olympics
Canoeists at the 2012 Summer Olympics
Living people
Olympic canoeists of Russia
Olympic canoeists of Uzbekistan
Russian male canoeists
Uzbekistani male canoeists
Asian Games medalists in canoeing
ICF Canoe Sprint World Championships medalists in kayak
Canoeists at the 2002 Asian Games
Canoeists at the 1998 Asian Games
European Games medalists in canoeing
Canoeists at the 2015 European Games
European Games silver medalists for Russia
Medalists at the 1998 Asian Games
Asian Games gold medalists for Uzbekistan
Asian Games bronze medalists for Uzbekistan